Sir Capell Bedell, 1st Baronet (1602 – 14 December 1643) was an English politician.

Bedell was the son of Sir Thomas Bedell, of Hamerton, Huntingdonshire, by Winifred Capell, daughter of Sir Arthur Capell, of Hadham, Hertfordshire. He matriculated into Queens' College, Cambridge as a 16-year-old in 1618.   He was created a baronet, of Hamerton in the County of Huntingdon, on 3 June 1622. Bedell later represented Hertford in Parliament in 1626 and Huntingdonshire from 1628 to 1629 and again in 1640. Between 1632 and 1633, he served as High Sheriff of Cambridgeshire and Huntingdonshire.

Bedell married Alice Fanshawe, daughter of Sir Henry Fanshawe. He died in December 1643. As he had no sons the baronetcy died with him. His daughter Mary married Sir Thomas Leventhorpe, 2nd Baronet.

References

1602 births
1643 deaths
Baronets in the Baronetage of England
High Sheriffs of Cambridgeshire and Huntingdonshire
English MPs 1626
English MPs 1628–1629
English MPs 1640 (April)
People from Hamerton